Luccombe Bay is a bay on the south-east coast of the Isle of Wight, England. It lies to the east of Luccombe Village from which it takes its name. It stretches from Horse Ledge in the north to Bordwood Ledge in the south. The sea bottom is a mixture of mud and rocks.

Along the top of the cliffs which line the bay is the site of the National trust maintained  Luccombe and the Landslip Walk.

The bay is best viewed from Luccombe Chine which descends to the beach about two-thirds of the way along the bay. There was a footpath down a set of wooden steps to the beach from the coastal path, but these are currently closed due to damage from landslips. A small fishing community existed at the foot of the Chine on the bay until it was destroyed in the Great Landslip of 1910. The area is the site of a lot of erosion and cliff retreat (though no cliff failures), with a loss of around a foot (30 cm) per year.

References

Bays of the Isle of Wight